The British Shorthair is the pedigreed version of the traditional British domestic cat, with a distinctively stocky body, dense coat, and broad face. The most familiar colour variant is the "British Blue", with a solid grey-blue coat, orange eyes, and a medium-sized tail. The breed has also been developed in a wide range of other colours and patterns, including tabby and colourpoint.

It is one of the most ancient cat breeds known. In modern times, it remains the most popular pedigreed breed in its native country, as registered by the UK's Governing Council of the Cat Fancy (GCCF). A quarter of all kittens registered with the GCCF each year are British Shorthairs, making the British the most popular pedigree cat in the UK.

The breed's good-natured appearance and relatively calm temperament make it a frequent media star, notably as the inspiration for John Tenniel's famous illustration of the Cheshire Cat from Alice in Wonderland. The Cat Fanciers' Association profile reads: "When gracelessness is observed, the British Shorthair is duly embarrassed, quickly recovering with a 'Cheshire cat smile'."

History 
The origins of the British Shorthair most likely date back to the first century AD, making it one of the most ancient identifiable cat breeds in the world. These cats were imported by the Romans who kept them to keep the camps clear of snakes, mice and insects.

These cats then interbred with the local European wildcat population. Over the centuries, their naturally isolated descendants developed into distinctively large, robust cats with a short but very thick coat, to better withstand conditions on their native islands. Based on artists' representations, the modern British Shorthair is unchanged from this initial type.

Selective breeding of the best examples of the type began in the nineteenth century, with emphasis on developing the unusual blue-grey variant called the "British Blue" or "English type" (to distinguish it from the more fine-boned "Russian type"). Some sources directly credit UK artist, and pioneering cat fancier, Harrison Weir with the initial concept of standardising the breed. Others suggest a group of breeders may have been involved. The new British Shorthair was featured at the first-ever cat show, organised by Weir and held at the Crystal Palace in London in 1871, and enjoyed great initial popularity.

By the 1900s with the advent of the newly imported Persian and other long-haired breeds, the British Shorthair had fallen out of favour, and breeding stock had become critically rare by World War I. At least partially to alleviate this, British Shorthair breeders mixed Persians into their bloodlines. The genes thus introduced would eventually become the basis for the British Longhair. At the time, any long-haired cats produced were placed into the Persian breeding program. As all cats with the blue colouration were then judged together as variants on a de facto single breed. The Blue Shorthair, outcrossings of the British with the Russian Blue were also common.

After the war, in an attempt to maintain the breed standard, the GCCF decided to accept only third-generation Persian/British Shorthair crosses. This contributed to another shortage of pure breeding stock by World War II, at which point the Persian and Russian Blue were reintroduced into the mix. British Shorthair breeders also worked with the French Chartreux, another ancient breed, which although genetically unrelated to the British Blue, is a very similar cat in appearance. Breeders worked to re-establish the true British type, and by the late 1970s, the distinctive British Shorthair had achieved formal recognition from both the Cat Fanciers' Association (CFA) and The International Cat Association (TICA). According to the GCCF's 2013 registry data, it is once again the most popular pedigreed breed in its native country.

Description

Appearance 

The British Shorthair is a relatively powerful-looking large cat, having a broad chest, strong thick-set legs with rounded paws and a medium-length, blunt-tipped tail. The head is relatively large and rounded, with a short muzzle, broad cheeks (most noticeable in mature males, who tend to develop prominent jowls) and large round eyes that are deep coppery orange in the British Blue and otherwise vary in colour depending on the coat. Their large ears are broad and widely set.

The British Blue variant can often be confused with the grey Scottish Fold, a breed closely related to the British Shorthair. However, the Shorthair can be characterised by having its pointy triangle ears, whereas the Fold has softer, folded ears.

They are slow to mature in comparison with most cat breeds, reaching full physical development at approximately three years of age. Unusually among domestic cats they are a noticeably sexually dimorphic breed, with males averaging  and females .

Coat, colour, and patterns 

The British Shorthair's coat is one of the breed's defining features. It is very dense but does not have an undercoat; thus, the texture is plush rather than woolly or fluffy, with a firm, "crisp" pile that breaks noticeably over the cat's body as it moves.

Although the British Blue remains the most familiar variant, British Shorthairs have been developed in many other colours and patterns. Black, blue, white, red, cream, silver, golden and—most recently—cinnamon and fawn are accepted by all official standards, either solid or in colourpoint, tabby, shaded and bicolour patterns; the GCCF, FIFe and TICA also accept chocolate and its dilute lilac, disallowed in the CFA standard. All colours and patterns also have tortoiseshell variants.

The Tabby patterns include: Classic Tabby, Mackerel Tabby, Spotted & Ticked Tabby. The non-tabby patterns include: Tortoiseshell, Bi-Colour, Van patterns Bi-Colour & White, Smoke, Tipped & Colourpointed.

British Shorthair's nose color: black, cherry red, brick red; a circle of black nasal line on the periphery.

Temperament 

British Shorthairs are an easygoing and dignified breed, not as active and playful as many, but sweet-natured and devoted to their owners, making them a favorite of animal trainers. They tend to be safe around other pets and children since they will tolerate a fair amount of physical interaction, but as a rule do not like to be picked up or carried. They require only minimal grooming and take well to being kept as indoor-only cats; however, they can be prone to obesity unless care is taken with their diet. They are quiet and vigilant, but if they trust their owners, they will silently follow the owners’ activities and stay with them. British Shorthair cats are not lap cats. They are more accustomed to staying beside people than squatting on people’s laps. Similarly, they prefer the feeling of having their feet on the ground. They have low voice and a moderate activity level. When there is no one at home, they will stay at home quietly and wait for their owners to come back.

Health 
The UK breed committee considers the British Shorthair a long-lived cat, with a life expectancy of 14–20 years. Vet clinic data from England shows a median lifespan of 11.8 years. Swedish insurance data puts the median lifespan of the breed at > 12.5 years. 82% of British Shorthairs lived to 10 years or more and 54% lived to 12.5 years or more.

Hypertrophic cardiomyopathy (HCM) can be a problem in the breed. A Danish prevalence study with more than 329 cats showed that 20.4% of males and 2.1% of the females had HCM. On top of this 6.4% of males and 3.5% of females were judged to be equivocal. HCM testing of males used for breeding is now mandatory for breeders organised under the Danish Fife member, Felis Danica.

The breed is thought to be at high risk of polycystic kidney disease (PKD). A DNA test lab has noted a significant decrease of the PKD mutations in tested populations. Carrier frequency is now at 1%.

Potential health problems 
Polycystic kidney disease

This disease forms a cyst in the cat's kidney, causing organ failure. Polycystic kidney disease can be detected through genetic testing or ultrasound. There is no cure for polycystic kidney disease but there are drugs that can alleviate the effects and its advancement.

Cardiomyopathy

The heart muscle thickens which limits the amount of blood that is pumped, leading to blood clots and heart failure. Cardiomyopathy can be detected through ultrasound, ECG, and x-ray. Drugs can alleviate and slow down the advancement of the disease.

And urinary tract diseases are very common.

Hyperthyroidism 
Some British Shorthairs have hyperthyroidism, which is caused by excessive thyroid hormone production, affecting metabolism. It brings serious problems to cats because thyroid hormone affects nearly all of cats' organs, especially their hearts. Older cats, in general, are more susceptible to it. Some of the signs are weight loss, panting, sickness, and greasy coat. Cats with hyperthyroidism need surgery and medication as treatment.

Cystitis 
Cystitis affects cats' urinary tracts and leads to inflammation in their urinary bladders. Cystitis is hard to cure. Stress, bacterial infection, and bladder stones usually cause cystitis. Some of the symptoms are frequent urination and having blood in cats' urine. Cats with cystitis need plenty of water and special medical diet. The treatments include anti-inflammatory medication and antibiotics.

Commemoration 
In 2022, the British Shorthair was one of eight cats featured on a series of UK postage stamps issued by the Royal Mail.

References

External links 

 The Interest Group Cat’s Healthy Hearts Association (IG HGK)
 British Shorthair kitten information, sources, breeders
 British Shorthair: Their History, Breeds and Other Facts

Cat breeds
Cat breeds originating in the United Kingdom
Natural cat breeds
Linebred animals